The Very Best of Deep Purple is a single disc compilation album by the British hard rock band Deep Purple. It was released in 2000 by Rhino Records/Warner Bros. Records. It features tracks by the Mk. I, Mk. II and Mk. III line-ups of Deep Purple.

Production
This compilation is supposed to be a single disc alternative to the more comprehensive Shades four-disc collection. All the tracks were remastered simultaneously for inclusion in both sets. The set is essentially a new version of previous compilation Deepest Purple: The Very Best of Deep Purple, which was released in 1980, with three additional songs, two from Mk. I and one from the reunited Mk. II. The disc bypasses the material from the Mk. IV line-up, and features slightly different versions of a few of the tracks.

Track listing
All tracks written by Ritchie Blackmore, Ian Gillan, Roger Glover, Jon Lord and Ian Paice, except where noted

Personnel
Ritchie Blackmore – guitar
Ian Gillan – vocals
Roger Glover – bass guitar
Ian Paice – drums
Jon Lord – organ, keyboards, backing vocals on tracks 1-2
Rod Evans – vocals on tracks 1-2
Nick Simper – bass and backing vocals on tracks 1-2
David Coverdale – vocals on tracks 13-14
Glenn Hughes – bass and vocals on tracks 13-14

Year-end charts

Certifications

References

2000 greatest hits albums
Deep Purple compilation albums
Rhino Records compilation albums
Warner Records compilation albums